A Layman is a pen-name used by:

 Thomas Hughes
 Sir Walter Scott